The Ancyloscelidini are a tribe of bees in the family Apidae.

Genera
Ancyloscelis
Chilimalopsis
Eremapis
Teratognatha

References

Apinae
Bee tribes